Festuca armoricana, the Breton fescue, is a species of grass endemic to Europe. It is a densely-clumped perennial with culms 9–36 cm long.

References

 Kew GrassBase entry
 GBIF entry

armoricana